Christopher John Dawson,  is the 34th Governor of Western Australia and a former police officer who served as the Commissioner of the Western Australia Police Force from 2017 to 2022. He was sworn in as governor on 15 July 2022.

Police career
Dawson joined Western Australia Police in February 1976 as a cadet. He was promoted to superintendent in 1999. The 2002 Queen's Birthday Honours saw him receive the Australian Police Medal. Dawson was appointed Deputy Commissioner in July 2004 under Karl O'Callaghan. Dawson led security arrangements at CHOGM 2011. He left Western Australia Police in April 2014 to be chief executive officer of the Australian Criminal Intelligence Commission. He was also Director of the Australian Institute of Criminology. He became the Commissioner of Western Australia Police in August 2017. Throughout the COVID-19 pandemic, Dawson acted in a number of roles, including State Emergency Coordinator and Vaccine Commander. Dawson received an honourable send-off on 14 July 2022 at Western Australia Police headquarters after five years as commissioner.

Governor of Western Australia
On 4 April 2022, Premier Mark McGowan announced Dawson as the replacement to Kim Beazley as the Governor of Western Australia, after Elizabeth II, Queen of Australia, and the WA Cabinet endorsed Dawson's appointment on the same day. He was sworn in on 15 July 2022 and was replaced as Police Commissioner by his former deputy Col Blanch. Dawson was the first police officer to be appointed as the Queen's representative for Western Australia.

Dawson was appointed a Companion of the Order of Australia in the 2023 Australia Day Honours for "eminent service to public administration through law enforcement roles, to reconciliation, and as the 34th Governor appointed in Western Australia".

References

Living people
Commissioners of Western Australia Police
Year of birth missing (living people)
Companions of the Order of Australia
Recipients of the Australian Police Medal
Governors of Western Australia